Homodotis amblyterma is a moth of the family Geometridae. It is endemic to New Zealand.

Taxonomy 
This species was first described by Edward Meyrick in 1931 and named Asaphodes amblyterma.

Description
Meyrick described this species as follows:

References

Moths of New Zealand
Moths described in 1931
Endemic fauna of New Zealand
Cidariini
Taxa named by Edward Meyrick
Endemic moths of New Zealand